Simonischek is a German language surname of slavic origin. Notable people with the name include:
 Max Simonischek (1982), Austrian–Swiss actor
 Peter Simonischek (1946), Austrian actor

References 

German-language surnames
Surnames of Austrian origin